1992 U.S. Open may refer to:
1992 U.S. Open (golf), a major golf tournament
1992 US Open (tennis), a Grand Slam tennis tournament
1992 U.S. Open Cup, a soccer tournament